Joe Wang Miller (Chinese: 王喆; born 3 February 1989) is a footballer who primarily plays as a forward for Tan Holdings. Born in China, he represents the Northern Mariana Islands national team.

Club career

MP United 

Miller was part of MP United's 2009 and 2010 squads. Saipan-based MP finished 2nd in the league in 2009, with Miller winning the top goalscorer award after scoring 23 goals in the season.  The following season MP went one better and won the championship, remaining unbeaten in the process. Joe was the league's top scorer again, with 15 goals. Miller has an incredible record at club level, having averaged 1.46 goals per game over the two seasons he has played for MP United. Miller also scored a hat-trick in a 2nd round 2010 KASA Cup match against Wild Bill's Independents, which MP United won 5-0. He then scored the only goal as MP squeezed past Inter Godfather's in the next round.

At MP United, Miller plays alongside Northern Mariana Islands national football team team-mates Nicolas B. Swaim, a midfielder, defender Adam Hardwicke, midfielder Yuki Adachi and fellow striker Kirk Schuler.

International career 

Miller wears the no.9 shirt for his country, a number which is often reserved for a team's most dangerous forward. Miller has scored 3 goals in four appearances for the Northern Mariana Islands national football team, making him the current squad's top scorer. Joe was called up to the country's squad for the East Asian Football Championship 2010 and scored one of Northern Mariana's three goals in the tournament. His goal came in Northern Mariana's opening game, a 6–1 loss to Macau on 11 March 2009. Miller's strike, in the fifth minute, put CNMI 1–0 up but Macau came back to score 6 goals without reply.

Joe had grabbed his first international goal in a 3–2 loss to Guam in the Marianas Cup on 29 April 2008.
Miller's goal in the 24th minute equalized for Northern Mariana Islands, but Guam went on to win the match in extra time.

International goals

Scores and results list Northern Mariana Islands' goal tally first, score column indicates score after each Miller goal.

Honors 

With MP United:

 2009 Northern Mariana Championship top goalscorer
 2010 Northern Mariana Championship top goalscorer
 2010 Northern Mariana Championship winner

See also 
 List of top international men's football goalscorers by country

References

External links 
 
 Player's profile at East Asian Football Federation

Living people
1989 births
Northern Mariana Islands footballers
Northern Mariana Islands international footballers
Association football forwards
Guam Shipyard players
Northern Mariana Islands people of Chinese descent